Maria Teresa Dizzia (born December 29, 1974) is an American actress. Dizzia was nominated for the 2010 Tony Award for Best Performance by a Featured Actress in a Play for her performance in In the Next Room (or The Vibrator Play).

Early life and education
Dizzia is the daughter of Lorraine (née Bladis) and John Paul Dizzia. She was raised in Cranford, New Jersey. She has a sister who is a lawyer. She graduated from Kent Place School in 1993, receiving the Drama Award upon graduation. She studied theater at Cornell University. She received her Master of Fine Arts from the University of California, San Diego.

Career
Dizzia performed the role of Eurydice in the Sarah Ruhl play Eurydice in regional theatre and Off-Broadway at the Second Stage Theatre, from June 18, 2007, to August 26, 2007. She performed in another Sarah Ruhl play In the Next Room on Broadway at the Lyceum Theatre, from October 22, 2009, to January 10, 2010. Her performance as Mrs. Daldry earned her a 2010 Tony Award nomination for Featured Actress in a Play.

Dizzia appeared in the premiere production of the Amy Herzog play Belleville at the Yale Repertory Theatre, from October 21, 2011, to November 12, 2011. She then appeared in the play Off-Broadway at the New York Theatre Workshop from March 3, 2013, to April 14, 2013. She was nominated for the 2013 Drama Desk Award, Outstanding Actress in a Play.

Dizzia has appeared on television in recurring roles on Orange is the New Black and 13 Reasons Why.  On film, she gave a critically acclaimed performance in Martha Marcy May Marlene and, in 2019, played the lead role in the Academy Award winning short, The Neighbors' Window.

Dizzia has also appeared as the mother in the director Owen Kline's debut feature Funny Pages.

Personal life
Dizzia is married to playwright Will Eno and has one child.

Filmography

Film

Television

Stage

References

External links

 
 
 Maria Dizzia theatre credits Broadway World

1974 births
Living people
Cornell University alumni
Kent Place School alumni
University of California, San Diego alumni
People from Cranford, New Jersey
Actresses from New Jersey
20th-century American actresses
21st-century American actresses
American stage actresses
American television actresses
American film actresses